Death of Yazdgerd (Marg-e Yazdgerd) is a 1982 Iranian drama film by Bahram Beyzai based on the play of the same name.

Plot
The story of the film is based on the murder of Yazdgerd III, the last emperor of Sasanian Persia, who while being hard pressed by the Arabs on his western flank, fled to Marv where he was slain by a miller in a mill, in which he had been taking refuge.

The film begins with the Zoroastrian high priest (magus) of the Persian Empire, accompanied by the imperial army commander entering the mill to try the miller accused of murdering the emperor. The miller, his wife and his daughter, while trying to exculpate themselves, all express a different version of the same incident. As the story shifts, more questions come up than are answered.

A central theme in the film is the social disaffection among the general population of Persia at the eve of the Arab Islamic conquests and inequality in the highly class-based society, in which the wealthy elite and the Magi had amassed a disproportionate amount of wealth that they owed to heavy taxation and the benefactions of the pious.

Book

The play was translated into English by Manuchehr Anvar and published in Tehran. Another English translation is named Death of the King, published in Stories from the Rains of Love and Death: Four Plays from Iran in Canada.

Cast
 Susan Taslimi as the miller's wife (زن آسیابان; zan-e āsiābān)
 Mehdi Hashemi as the miller (آسیابان; āsiābān)
 Mahmoud Behrouzian as the priest (موبد; mobad)
 Amin Tarokh as the general (سردار اسپهبد; sardār spāhbed)
 Karim Akbari Mobarakeh as the army chief (سرکرده; sarkarde)
 Yasaman Arami as the miller's daughter (دختر; doxtar)
 Ali Reza Khamseh as the soldier (سرباز; sarbāz)

References

Films based on plays by Bahram Beyzai
Films directed by Bahram Bayzai
Films set in the 7th century
History of Iran on film
Iranian historical drama films